Marthe Crick-Kuntziger (1891–1963) was a Belgian museum curator at the Royal Museums of Art and History, where she specialized in tapestries and was the author of a hundred publications in her field. She was awarded the five-yearly Edmond Marchal Prize of the Royal Academy of Science, Letters and Fine Arts of Belgium for 1933–1937.

Life 
In 1919, Marthe Crick-Kuntziger graduated with a doctorate in art history and archeology from the University of Liège, where she studied with Marcel Laurent. This was a time when few women attended university.

She created the catalogues of the drawings and the engravings (1920) in the city of Liège collections. She wrote a  monograph on the drawings of Lambert Lombard. She contributed to L'Art en Belgique, edited by Paul Fierens, and wrote a section on the decorative arts for Stan Leurs' multivolume Geschiedenis van de Vlaamsche Kunst.

In 1930 she participated in the international congress for art history in Brussels. She was a member of the Royal Academy of Archaeology of Belgium, and the Royal Archaeological Society of Brussels, of which she was president from 1949.

Publications
 "A Fragment of Guillaume De Hellande's Tapestries", Burlington Magazine for Connoisseurs, 45:260 (1924), pp. 225-231.
 "L'Auteur Des Cartons De 'Vertumne Et Pomone'", Oud-Holland, 44:1 (1927), pp. 159-173.
 "The Tapestries in the Palace of Liege", Burlington Magazine for Connoisseurs, 50:289 (1927), pp. 172-183.
 "Bernard van Orley et le décor mural en tapisserie", in Bernard van Orley 1488–1541 (Société Royale d’Archéologie de Bruxelles, Brussels, 1943).
 Les Tapisseries de l'Hôtel de Ville de Bruxelles (Antwerp, 1944).

References

Further reading
 Joseph De Borchgrave d'Altena, "Madame Crick-Kuntziger, conservateur honoraire", Bulletin des Musées Royaux d'Art et d'Histoire/Bulletin van de Koninklijke Musea voor Kunst en Geschiedenis, 4th series, 29 (1957), pp. 126-130
 J. Squilbeck, "Mme Lucien Crick, née Marthe Kuntziger, Liège 2 avril 1891 - Bruxelles 30 mai 1963", Bulletin des Musées Royaux d'Art et d'Histoire/Bulletin van de Koninklijke Musea voor Kunst en Geschiedenis, 4th series, 35 (1963), pp. 135-137
 Marguerite Calberg, "Marthe Crick-Kuntziger (Liège 1891 - Bruxelles 1963)", Revue Belge d'Archéologie et d'Histoire de l'Art/Belgisch Tijdschrift voor Oudheidkunde en Kunstgeschiedenis, 35 (1966), pp. 112-115
 Yvette Marcus-de Groot, "'Geen mooier studievak voor een vrouw dan de kunstgeschiedenis'. Vrouwelijke kunsthistorici en hun aandeel in de traditie", in Elck zijn Waerom, edited by Katlijne Van der Stighelen and Mirjam Westen (Ghent: Ludion, 1999), pp. 102-113
 Yvette Marcus-de Groot, Kunsthistorische vrouwen van weleer. De eerste generatie in Nederland vóór 1921 (Hilversum: Verloren, 2003), pp. 170-172

1891 births
1963 deaths
Belgian art curators
Writers from Liège
Belgian women curators